The Bulls Football Club are an American football team located in Asaka, Saitama, Japan.  They are a member of the X-League.

Team history
1981 Team founded by former Nihon University American football players and staff.
1999 Joined the X-League X3 league.
2004 Team named changed from Wako Securities Bulls to Nihon Unisys Bulls. Began operating as a club team.
2006 Promoted from X3 to X2.
2009 Promoted from X2 to X1. Finished 3rd in the East division (3 wins, 2 losses). Advanced to the 2nd stage. Lost 2nd stage matches to Fujitsu 0-61 and Asahi Soft Drinks 13–55.
2013 Following the addition of new multiple team sponsors, team is renamed the Bulls Football Club.

Seasons
{| class="wikitable"
|bgcolor="#FFCCCC"|X-League Champions (1987–present)
|bgcolor="#DDFFDD"|<small>Division Champions</small>
|bgcolor="#D0E7FF"|Final Stage/Semifinals Berth
|bgcolor="#96CDCD"|Wild Card /2nd Stage Berth
|}

Import playersCurrentFormer'''

References

External links
  (Japanese)

American football in Japan
1985 establishments in Japan
American football teams established in 1985
X-League teams